The Oboe Concerto is a composition for solo oboe and orchestra by the Scottish composer James MacMillan.  The work was commissioned by the Britten Sinfonia and was first performed at the Birmingham Town Hall on 15 October 2010 by the oboist Nicholas Daniel and the Britten Sinfonia under MacMillan.  The Oboe Concerto piece is dedicated to Nicholas Daniel and the Britten Sinfonia.

Composition
The Oboe Concerto has a duration of roughly 23 minutes and is composed in three numbered movements.  MacMillan described the movements in the score programme notes, writing:

Instrumentation
The work is scored for solo oboe and an orchestra comprising two flutes, cor anglais, two clarinets, bassoon, contrabassoon, two horns, two trumpets, timpani, and strings.

Reception
David Honigmann of the Financial Times highly praised the concerto, saying, "Oboists may feel ruefully that musical history owes them a showpiece. They have one now: James MacMillan's Oboe Concerto turns the soloist into a nimble-footed musical athlete, a star opera singer, a dazzling Highland dancer, all in the space of three varied movements."  Warwick Arnold of Limelight similarly described the piece as "a bold virtuosic work that should prove popular with both players and audiences."  Michael Dervan of The Irish Times further wrote:

See also
List of compositions by James MacMillan

References

Concertos by James MacMillan
2010 compositions
MacMillan
Music commissioned by the Britten Sinfonia